Shivon Alice Zilis (born February 8, 1986) is a Canadian venture capitalist who works in the technology and artificial intelligence fields.

Early life and education 
Shivon Alice Zilis was born in Markham, Ontario, Canada on 8 February 1986 to Sharda, a Punjabi Indian, and Richard, a white Canadian. She is an only child and one of her parents is a former federal bureaucrat. Zilis graduated from Markham's Unionville High School. She graduated from Yale University on academic and athletic financial aid in 2008, with degrees in economics and philosophy. She identifies with philosophers Friedrich Nietzsche and David Hume. At Yale, she played on the ice hockey team and is credited with one of the all-time best save percentages as a goalkeeper at the school. Outside of athletics, she played the drums and guitar and read literature. Zilis was inspired by Canadian band Our Lady Peace to read the 1999 book The Age of Spiritual Machines by Ray Kurzweil, and has studied artificial intelligence ever since.

Career 
After graduating from Yale, Zilis initially planned to return to Canada but instead started her career at IBM in New York, working in financial technologies in developing countries, especially Peru and Indonesia. From 2012 to 2018, she was one of the founding investors and partner of Bloomberg Beta, funded by Bloomberg L.P., utilizing what she calls "machine intelligence".
She is a Fellow at the Creative Destruction Lab (a machine learning incubator at University of Toronto), on the board of Vector Institute for Artificial Intelligence and Alberta Machine Intelligence Institute, and a charter member of C100. 

She co-hosts an annual conference at the University of Toronto that brings together the foremost authors, academics, founders, and investors in machine intelligence. She was named among LinkedIn's 35 Under 35. In 2015, Zilis was listed on the Forbes 30 Under 30 list for venture capital. Zilis serves as director of operations and special projects at Neuralink and reports directly to Elon Musk. Zilis met Musk through her non-profit work at OpenAI, of which she is currently a board member. Although Musk co-founded OpenAI, as of 2019, he is no longer involved in the organization or its board. From 2017 to 2019, she served as a project director for Tesla, Inc.'s Autopilot product and chip design team.

Personal life 
In July 2022, it was revealed through the obtaining of Travis County, Texas court documents that Zilis had twins with Elon Musk who were born in November 2021. Executives claimed that they were born via in vitro fertilization (IVF). She stated in 2020, that Musk is the person she admires most despite criticism towards him. According to court documents to register the twins' names, Musk and Zilis listed the same address in Austin.

References 

Living people
1986 births
Yale College alumni
Yale Bulldogs women's ice hockey players
Canadian people of Indian descent
Canadian people of Punjabi descent
Musk family
People from Markham, Ontario
IBM Women
IBM people
Canadian expatriates in the United States
21st-century Canadian businesswomen
21st-century Canadian businesspeople
Businesspeople from San Francisco
Canadian venture capitalists
Women investors
Businesspeople from Ontario